Kate Cordsen (born 1966, Great Falls, Virginia, United States) is an American photographer and contemporary artist. Cordsen lives in New York City.

Education 

She received a BA in the history of art and East Asian Studies from Washington and Lee University (founded 1749) where she was the first woman in the university's history to receive an undergraduate degree. Cordsen has an MPP from Georgetown University and studied Chinese and Japanese Art History at Harvard University and photography at the International Center of Photography.

In the late 1980s Kate Cordsen was represented by Ford Models. She worked closely with Japanese avant-garde artists Rei Kawakubo, Issey Miyake and Yohji Yamamoto, appearing on the runway and in print. Cordsen credits this time as a model as both the beginning of her education in photography and as formative in understanding Japanese aesthetics.

Work 
Known for large format landscapes, Cordsen produces ethereal and ambiguous images that evoke ideas of fragmented memories and temporality.  Her landscapes are, at first glance, simply meditative, but reveal impassioned and dramatic depths upon second and third looks. She often combines 19th century chemical methods with traditional film and digital technologies. Kate Cordsen's landscapes are a hybrid study of both photography and painting.

See also
 List of photographers
 List of women photographers
 List of people from Great Falls, Virginia
 List of Harvard University people
 List of Georgetown University alumni

References

External links
 

Photographers from New York (state)
Washington and Lee University alumni
McCourt School of Public Policy alumni
Female models from Virginia
Living people
People from Great Falls, Virginia
Female models from New York (state)
Artists from New York City
20th-century American women photographers
20th-century American photographers
1966 births